Sebastian Jacob (born 26 June 1993) is a German professional footballer who plays as a forward for 1. FC Saarbrücken.

Career statistics

References

German footballers
1993 births
Living people
Association football forwards
1. FC Kaiserslautern players
1. FC Saarbrücken players
2. Bundesliga players
Regionalliga players
Sportspeople from Saarbrücken
21st-century German people